Blue Mountain is a 1997 Swiss drama film directed by Thomas Tanner. It was entered into the 20th Moscow International Film Festival.

Cast
 Chandra Goetz as Sonia
 Sabina Lüthi as Melanie
 Eva Scheurer as Renate
 Wolf Hofer as Manfred
 Daniel Bill as Röffe

References

External links
 

1997 films
1997 drama films
1990s German-language films
Swiss drama films